Leunovo is a village in the municipality of Mavrovo and Rostuša, North Macedonia.

Demographics
In statistics gathered by Vasil Kanchov in 1900, the village was inhabited by 900 Bulgarian Exarchists and 55 Muslim Albanians.

According to the 2002 census, the village had a total of 6 inhabitants. Ethnic groups in the village include:

Macedonians 6

As of the 2021 census, Leunovo had 31 residents with the following ethnic composition:
Macedonians 27
Persons for whom data are taken from administrative sources 4

References

Villages in Mavrovo and Rostuša Municipality